The Wilson Defensive Player of the Year Award was awarded annually to the best defensive player at each fielding position in Major League Baseball (MLB).  The award was given between 2012 and 2019. An overall Defensive Player of the Year and a Defensive Team of the Year were also selected annually. Unlike the Rawlings Gold Glove Awards, which are voted on by major league managers and coaches, the Wilson Defensive Player of the Year Award winners were determined by statistics using sabermetrics.

History

In 2012, baseball glove manufacturer Wilson created the Defensive Player of the Year Award to honor the best defensive player on each team in Major League Baseball (MLB). Additionally, one player was selected from each league as that league's overall Defensive Player of the Year. Starting in 2014, the individual awards are given to the best defensive player at each position, regardless of league, and there is a single Defensive Player of the Year for all of MLB. Since 2012, a single Defensive Team of the Year across all of MLB has also been named.

Various players have won a Defensive Player award multiple times, with Andrelton Simmons having the most wins, six. Zack Greinke is the only pitcher to have won multiple times, three. Denard Span was the first person to receive Defensive Player awards with two different teams, and in both leagues, having won in 2012 with the Minnesota Twins and in 2013 with the Washington Nationals. No one has been named Overall Defensive Player more than once, although the Atlanta Braves have had three winners and the Boston Red Sox have had two winners. The Arizona Diamondbacks are the only team to have been named Defensive Team of the Year multiple times, three.

Key

Winners
During the first two years, the award was given to the best defensive player on each team in Major League Baseball.  Starting in 2014, the award is given to the best fielder at each position in all of Major League Baseball. Numbers after a player's name indicate multiple times winning the award.

American League (2012–2013)

National League (2012–2013)

Major League Baseball (2014–2019)

Overall Defensive Player of the Year

The Overall Defensive Player of the Year Award was inaugurated in 2012, with one player each from the American and National Leagues receiving the award. In 2014, the separate awards per league were eliminated, and in 2015 to 2019 only one player in all of Major League Baseball received the honor.

Defensive Team of the Year

Numbers after a team's name indicate multiple times winning the award.

See also
Fielding Bible Award
Esurance MLB Awards – includes Best Defensive Player

References

External links
 All-time winners at MLB.com

Awards established in 2012
Major League Baseball trophies and awards